Audrey Marie Hilley (née Frazier; June 4, 1933 – February 26, 1987) was an American murderer and suspected serial killer. Her life and crime spree are the subjects of the 1991 telefilm Wife, Mother, Murderer.

Early life and first crimes
Audrey Marie Frazier was born on June 4, 1933 in the Blue Mountain area of Anniston, Alabama to Lucille (née Meads) and Huey Frazier. She married Frank Hilley on May 8, 1951; they had two children, Mike and Carol. Despite Frank's well-paying job and Marie's secretarial employment, the couple had little money set aside in savings due to Frazier's excessive spending habits, leading to friction in the marriage. Unknown to Frank, his wife frequently engaged in sex with her bosses in exchange for money or superior performance evaluations. Frank began suffering from a mysterious illness, as did his son Mike, but Mike's symptoms  which his doctors attributed to stomach flu  abruptly stopped when he moved away to attend a seminary.

In 1975, after returning home early due to his illness, Frank found Marie in bed with her boss. Frank turned to Mike, then an ordained minister living in Atlanta, for advice. In May 1975, a short time after a visit from Mike, Frank visited his doctor complaining of nausea and tenderness in his abdomen, being diagnosed with a viral stomach ache. The condition persisted and he was admitted to a hospital, where tests indicated a malfunction of the liver and doctors diagnosed infectious hepatitis. He died early in the morning of May 25.

Frank's autopsy, performed with his wife's permission, revealed swelling of the kidneys and lungs, bilateral pneumonia, and inflammation of the stomach. Because the symptoms closely resembled those of hepatitis, that was listed as Frank's cause of death and no further tests were conducted. Frank had maintained a moderate life insurance policy, secretly taken out by Marie at the time of his initial illness, that she redeemed for $31,140.

Three years later, Marie took out a $25,000 life insurance policy on her daughter Carol; a $25,000 accidental death rider took effect in August 1978. Within a few months, Carol began experiencing trouble with nausea and was admitted to the emergency room several times. A year after filing the insurance policy on her daughter, Marie gave Carol an injection that she claimed would alleviate the nausea. However, the symptoms only worsened, with Carol's enduring numbness in her extremities. After medical tests found no disease, Carol's physician, fearing the symptoms were psychosomatic, had her undergo psychiatric testing at Birmingham, Alabama's Carraway Methodist Hospital. There, Carol secretly received two more injections from her mother, who warned her not to tell others about the shots.

A month after Carol was admitted to the hospital, her physician said she was suffering from malnutrition and vitamin deficiencies, adding that he suspected heavy metal poisoning was to blame for the symptoms. Panicking, Marie had Carol discharged from the hospital that afternoon. The following day, Carol was admitted to the University of Alabama Hospital. Coincidentally, Marie was arrested for passing bad checks; they were written to the insurance company that insured Carol's life, causing that policy to lapse. University physicians concentrated their investigation on the possibility of heavy metal poisoning, noting that Carol's hands and feet were numb, she had nerve palsy causing foot drop, and she had lost most of her deep tendon reflexes.

Arrest
Physicians noticed Aldrich-Mees' lines on Carol's nails. Forensic tests on samples of her hair were conducted by the Alabama Department of Forensic Sciences on October 3, 1979, revealing arsenic levels ranging from over 100 times the normal level close to the scalp to zero times the normal level at the end of the hair shaft. This indicated that Carol had been given increasingly larger doses of arsenic over a period of four to eight months. That same day, Frank Hilley's body was exhumed, and upon examination, showed between 10 times and 100 times the normal level of arsenic. It was concluded that both Frank and Carol had suffered from chronic arsenic poisoning, with Frank's poisoning being fatal.

Marie was incarcerated on her bad check charges when she was arrested on October 9 for the attempted murder of her daughter. The police in Anniston, Alabama found a vial in her purse, tests of which revealed the presence of arsenic. Two weeks later, Frank Hilley's sister found a jar of rat poison which contained 1.4–1.5% arsenic. On November 9, Marie was released on bail, after which she registered at a local motel under an assumed name and disappeared. While a note was left behind indicating that she "might have been kidnapped," Marie was listed as a fugitive.

Escape
On November 19, a burglary occurred at the home of Marie's aunt. The occupant's car had been stolen as well as some clothes and an overnight bag. Investigators found a note in the house reading "Do not call police. We will burn you out if you do. We found what we wanted and will not bother you again."

On January 11, 1980, she was indicted in absentia for her husband's murder. Subsequently, investigators found that both her mother and her mother-in-law, Carrie Hilley, had significant, but not fatal, traces of arsenic in their systems when they died. The remains of Sonya Marcelle Gibson, an eleven-year-old friend of Carol Hilley's who had died of indeterminate causes in 1974, were also exhumed and examined, but were found to contain only a "normal" amount of arsenic. Gibson was one of the many neighborhood children who had fallen ill after drinking beverages that they had been given during visits to the Hilley household. Two police officers who had been dispatched to look into a disturbance that Marie had called 911 about also reported coming down with nausea and stomach cramps after drinking coffee that Marie had offered them.

Although police and the FBI launched a massive manhunt, Marie Hilley remained a fugitive for a little more than three years.

New names, new lives
Marie first travelled to Florida, where she met a man named John Greenleaf Homan III. She was using the name Robbi Hannon. They lived together for more than a year before she married Homan on May 29, 1981, and took his last name. The couple moved to New Hampshire. She frequently talked about her imaginary twin sister "Teri", who supposedly lived in Texas.

Late in the summer of 1982, she left New Hampshire, telling her husband that she needed to attend to family business and to see some doctors about an illness. During this time she travelled to Texas and Florida, using the alias Teri Martin.

During the trip, using the alias Teri Martin, she called John Homan and informed him that Robbi Homan had died in Texas but there was no need for him to come to Texas because the body had been donated to medical science. After getting to know "Teri" over the phone, Homan expressed interest in meeting her. She agreed, saying he needed to put "Robbi's" death behind them.

On November 1982, after changing her hair color and losing weight, Marie returned to New Hampshire and met John Homan, posing as Teri Martin, his “deceased” wife's sister.

An obituary for Robbi Homan appeared in a New Hampshire newspaper, but aroused suspicion when police were unable to verify any of the information it contained. John Homan's coworkers also had suspicions about his new "sister-in-law" and were concerned defalcation may have been at play. A New Hampshire state police detective surmised that the woman living as Teri Martin was Robbi Homan and had staged her death. The concerned coworkers and Homan's boss discovered that Medical Research Institute of Texas, where "Robbi's" body was handed over for study, was nonexistent, as was the church that eulogized her death. While Homan's workplace was audited and no embezzlement found, authorities still believed that "Teri Martin" was possibly a fugitive bank robber named Carol Manning (later disproven) or wanted on other outstanding charges. In the meantime, "Teri" had taken a secretarial job in nearby Brattleboro, Vermont and was arrested. While being interrogated by Vermont state troopers, she confessed that she was wanted in Alabama on bad check charges and her true name was Audrey Marie Hilley. Contact with Alabama state police confirmed this, and she was also wanted for far more serious charges. She promptly was extradited to Alabama to stand trial.

She was quickly convicted and sentenced to life in prison for her husband's murder and 20 years for attempting to kill her daughter.

Incarceration and death
Audrey Marie Hilley Homan began serving her sentence in 1983 at the Julia Tutwiler Prison for Women in Wetumpka, Alabama, a maximum-security prison. Due to her clerical career, she was often assigned to doing paperwork and was considered a quiet model prisoner. This good behavior earned her several one-day passes from prison, from which she returned as scheduled.

In February 1987, she was given a three-day pass to visit her husband John Homan, who had moved to Anniston, Alabama to be closer to his wife. They spent a day at an Anniston motel, and when Homan left for a few hours, she disappeared, leaving behind a note for Homan asking his forgiveness. Homan promptly alerted police. Her escape prompted an inquiry into Alabama's furlough policy.

Four days after she vanished from the motel Hilley was found delirious on the back porch of a house in Anniston, Alabama, less than a mile from her birthplace in Blue Mountain. The woman who found Hilley described her appearance as scary, stating she was dirty with mud on her face and long fingernails. She alerted police, who then summoned paramedics.

Hilley was conscious at the scene but had convulsions and lost consciousness while being transported to a nearby hospital for treatment. Upon arrival at the hospital she suffered a heart attack. Doctors attempted to revive her and raise her body tempterature but were unsuccessful, and she was pronounced dead 3 1/2 hours after being found. The coroner believed she had been crawling around in the woods, drenched by four days of frequent rain and exposed to temperatures that dropped to around freezing. Her final cause of death was attributed to hypothermia and exposure.

See also
 Blanche Taylor Moore
 Stacey Castor
 Velma Barfield
 Judy Buenoano

References

Further reading

"Last Chapter Of Black Widow Saga: Muddy, Cold, Dying Near Birthplace," The Associated Press, February 27, 1987

"'Black Widow' spins a new web," United Press International, February 26, 1987

1933 births
1987 deaths
20th-century American criminals
American escapees
American female criminals
American female murderers
American people convicted of attempted murder
American people convicted of murder
American prisoners sentenced to life imprisonment
Criminals from Alabama
Deaths from hypothermia
Escapees from Alabama detention
Murderers for life insurance money
People convicted of murder by Alabama
People from Anniston, Alabama
People who faked their own death
Poisoners
Prisoners sentenced to life imprisonment by Alabama
Suspected serial killers